The Phipps family of the United States is a prominent American family that descends from Henry Phipps Jr. (1839–1930), a businessman and philanthropist. His father was an English shoemaker who immigrated in the early part of the 19th century to Philadelphia, Pennsylvania, before settling in Pittsburgh. Phipps grew up with Andrew Carnegie as a friend and neighbor. As an adult, he was Carnegie's business partner in the Carnegie Steel Company and became a very wealthy man. He was the company's second-largest shareholder and also invested in real estate.

After selling his stock in Carnegie Steel, Phipps became a leading advocate of housing for the poor and a major philanthropist. He embraced the principle that those who have achieved great wealth should give back for the public good and create institutions dedicated to that purpose. Phipps and his wife Anne had five children: Amy, John S., Helen, Henry Carnegie, and Howard.

Business activities
In 1907, Phipps established the Bessemer Trust Company to manage his substantial assets that would be shared by his offspring following his death. Phipps was also one of the pioneer investors in Florida real estate. At one time, he and his family owned one-third of the town of Palm Beach, 28 miles of oceanfront between Palm Beach and Fort Lauderdale, prime bayfront property in downtown Miami, and 75 square miles of land in Martin County. The Phipps family donated to the town of Palm Beach one of the most significant gifts in county history: an ocean-to-lake frontage property that is now known as Phipps Park. Another contribution was the Phipps Conservatory and Botanical Gardens in Pittsburgh.

The Phipps family owned country estates in Old Westbury, New York, on the Gold Coast, the stretch of land on the North Shore of Long Island that once held the greatest concentration of wealth and power in America.

Phipps built a mansion on 115 acres in Lake Success, New York (also on the Gold Coast), which he used from its completion in 1919 until his death in 1930. During World War II, John Phipps and his wife Margarita arranged for the home to be used to house British evacuees. In 1949, the family donated the property to the Great Neck School District. The mansion was converted into the administration building for the district, and Great Neck South High School and South Middle School were built on the site.

Legacy
By 1974, Bessemer Trust Company developed an expertise in wealth management that allowed it to take on other clients through the creation of a national bank headquartered in New York City. Phipps' grandchildren, from his son John S. Phipps, donated to the public the Westbury House estate that is now known as Old Westbury Gardens.

Gladys Mills Phipps, granddaughter of Darius Ogden Mills and wife of Henry Carnegie Phipps, was prominent among horse breeders and owners in American Thoroughbred horse racing, as were her son, daughters and several grandchildren and great-grandchildren. She founded Wheatley Stable with her brother, Odgen Livingston Mills. Recently, first cousins Odgen Mills (Dinny) Phipps and Stewart Janney III's horse Orb won the 2013 Kentucky Derby.

Lineage
Family members include:

 Henry Phipps Jr. (1839-1930), owner of Bonnie Blink, Lake Success
 Lawrence C. Phipps (1862-1958), nephew of Henry W., United States Senator from Colorado.
 Amy Phipps Guest (1872-1959), daughter of Henry W. Phipps Jr., owner of Templeton, Old Westbury and Villa Artemis, Palm Beach, sponsor of Amelia Earhart
 John Shaffer Phipps (1874-1958), oldest son of Henry W. Phipps Jr., owner of Westbury House, Old Westbury and Casa Bendita, Palm Beach
 Helen Phipps Martin (1876-1934), daughter of Henry W. Phipps Jr., owner of Knole, Old Westbury
 Henry Carnegie Phipps (1879-1953), son of Henry W. Phipps Jr., owner of Spring Hill, Old Westbury and Heamaw, Palm Beach
 Howard Phipps (1881-1981), son of Henry W. Phipps Jr., owner of Erchless, Old Westbury
 Gladys Mills Phipps (1883-1970), wife of Henry Carnegie Phipps
 Lillian Bostwick Phipps (1906-1987), wife of Odgen Phipps
 Ogden Phipps (1908-2002), son of Henry Carnegie Phipps
 Cynthia Phipps (1945- 2007), daughter of Henry Carnegie Phipps
 Ogden Mills "Dinny" Phipps (1940-2016), great-grandson of Henry W. Phipps Jr.
 Raymond R. Guest (1907-1991), son of Amy Phipps Guest
 Winston Frederick Churchill Guest (1906-1982), son of Amy Phipps Guest
 Diana Guest Manning (1909-1994), daughter of Amy Phipps Guest
 Barbara Phipps Janney (1911-1987), daughter of Henry Carnegie Phipps
 Stuart Symington Janney III (born 1948), great-grandson of Henry W. Phipps Jr., grandson of Henry Carnegie Phipps 
 Andrew Sidamon-Eristoff (born 1963), great-grandson of Henry W. Phipps Jr., grandson of Howard Phipps
 Randolph Hobson Guthrie III (born 1967)
 William Cattell Trimble III (born 1962), great-great grandson of Henry Phipps., grandson of Barbara Phipps Janney

Family tree

Henry Phipps Sr. ∞ Hannah Frank
John Phipps
Henry Phipps Jr. (1839–1930) ∞ Anne Childs Shaffer (1850–1934) in 1872
Amy Phipps (1872–1959) ∞ Frederick Edward Guest (1875–1937) (grandson of John Spencer-Churchill, 7th Duke of Marlborough, and first cousin of Winston Churchill) in 1905
Winston Frederick Churchill Guest (1906–1982) ∞ (1) Helena Woolworth McCann (granddaughter of F. W. Woolworth) in 1934, div. 1944; ∞ (2) Lucy Douglas Cochran (1920–2003) in 1947
Winston Alexander Guest (b. 1936) ∞ Helen Mane Elizabeth Shields in 1967
Winston Frederick Churchill Guest (b. 1968)
Helena Woolworth Guest (b. 1970)
Spencer Randolph Harrison Guest (b. 1984)
Frederick E. Guest II (b. 1938) ∞ (1) Stephanie Wanger in 1963 (2) Carole Baldoff in 1988
Victoria Woolworth Guest (b. 1966)
Vanessa Wanger Guest (b. 1973)
Frederick Edward Guest III (b. 1975)
Andrew Churchill Guest (b. 1976)
Alexander Michael Dudley Churchill Guest (b. 1954) ∞ Elizabeth Geacintov in 1986
Gregory Winston Churchill Guest (b. 1990)
Cornelia Cochrane Churchill Guest (b. 1963)
Raymond Richard Guest (1907–1991) ∞ (1) Elizabeth ("Lily") Polk (daughter of Frank Polk) ∞ (2) Ellen Tuck French Astor in 1953 ∞ (3) Princess Caroline Cecile Alexandrine Jeanne Murat (1923–2012) (granddaughter of Joachim Napoléon Murat, 5th Prince Murat)
Elizabeth Guest
Raymond Richard Guest Jr. (1939–2001)
Virginia Guest
Achille Murat Guest ∞ Judith Wall
Laetitia Amelia Guest
Diana Guest (1909–1994) ∞ (1) Marc Sevastopoulo in 1934, div.; ∞ (2) Count Jean de Gaillard de la Valdène (1895–1977) in 1943, div.; (3) Allen Manning in 1970
Diane Lorraine Sevastopoulo (b. 1935) ∞ (1) Pierre Firmin-Didot in 1955 ∞ (2) Arthur Peter Perkins in 1967
Isabelle Marie Firmin-Didot (b. 1962)
Christine Aimée Firmin-Didot (b. 1963) ∞ Antonio Bulridge in 1987
Guy Winston de Gaillard de la Valdène (b. 1944) ∞ Thérèse Anderson in 1965
Valery Elaine de la Valdène (1966–2014)
Jean Pierre de la Valdène (b. 1967)
Lorraine Aimee de Gaillard de la Valdène (b. 1946) ∞ Christian Odasso in 1978
Fréderic Christian Odasso (b. 1978)
Diana Melody Christina Odasso (b. 1979)
John Shaffer Phipps (1874–1958) ∞ Margarita Celia Grace (daughter of Michael P. Grace) in 1903
John H. H. Phipps (1904–1982) ∞ Elinor Klapp Phipps
Colin Phipps
Eugene Phipps
Hubert Beaumont Phipps (1905–1969)  ∞ (1) Carla Gordon (d. 1950), her death; ∞ (2) Lady Pheobe Pleydell-Bouverie (1932–1995) (daughter of William Pleydell-Bouverie, 7th Earl of Radnor) in 1950, div. 1963
Melissa Adeane Phipps (b. 1955)
Hubert Grace Phipps (b. 1957)
Margaret Phipps Boegner (1906–2006) ∞ (1) J. Gordon Douglas Jr. in 1930, div. 1947; ∞ (2) Etienne Boegner (d. 1985) in 1951 (son of Marc Boegner)
J. Gordon Douglas III
Dita Amory Douglas ∞ Alick David Yorke Naylor-Leyland (1929–1991) (son of Albert Edward Herbert Naylor-Leyland, 2nd Baronet)
Nicholas Edward Naylor-Leyland
Michael Grace Phipps (1910–1973) ∞ Muriel Fillans "Molly" Lane
Susan Grace Phipps Cochran Santangelo Eigelberger
Elaine Lane "Nonie" Phipps Schippers (1939–1973)
Helen Margaret Phipps (1876–1934) ∞ Bradley Martin (brother-in-law of William Craven, 4th Earl of Craven) in 1904
Henry Carnegie Phipps (1879–1953) ∞ Gladys Livingston Mills (1883–1970) (twin sister of Beatrice Forbes, Countess of Granard) in 1907
Ogden Phipps (1908–2002) ∞ (1) Ruth Bruyn in 1930, div. 1935; ∞ (2) Lillian Stokes Bostwick McKim (1906–1987) in 1937
Henry Ogden Phipps (1931–1962)
Robert Lansing (b. 1933)
Ogden Mills Phipps (1940–2016)
Cynthia Phipps (1945–2007)
Audrey Phipps
Sonia Phipps
Barbara Phipps (1911–1987) ∞ Stuart Symington Janney Jr. (1907–1988)
Stuart Symington Janney III ∞ Lynn
Matthew Janney
Emily Janney
Howard Phipps (1881–1981) ∞ Harriet Dyer Price (granddaughter of Alexander B. Dyer) in 1931
Howard Phipps Jr.
Anne Phipps

Family Network

Associates

Andrew Carnegie
Thomas M. Carnegie
William Ellis Corey
Henry Clay Frick
Grace family
Elbert Henry Gary
Freddie Guest
Arthur B. Hancock Jr.
George Lauder Jr.
John George Alexander Leishman
Bradley Martin Jr.
Shug McGaughey
Ogden L. Mills
Addison Mizner
Edward A. Neloy

Businesses

Ayavalla Land Company
Bessemer Properties
Bessemer Trust
Bessemer Venture Partners
Carnegie Steel
Denver Broncos
 The Fauquier Democrat
Ingersoll Rand
International Hydro-Electric System
International Paper
New England Power Association
Orchard Pond Organics
Palm Beach Company
Phipps Land Company
Snow Phipps Group, LLC
U.S. Steel 
WCTV
Wheatley Stable

Philanthropy & miscellaneous non-profits

Elinor Klapp-Phipps Park
Caribbean Conservation Corporation
Gulf Stream Golf Club 
Gulfstream Polo Club
Henry Phipps Psychiatric Clinic
Howard Phipps Foundation
John S. Phipps Family Foundation
Phipps-Florida Foundation
Phipps Houses 

 Phipps Tuberculosis Dispensary
William A. Shine Great Neck South High School

Buildings, estates & historic sites

Ayavalla Plantation
Bonnie Blink 
El Cid Historic District
Old Westbury Gardens
Orchard Pond Plantation
Phipps Conservatory and Botanical Gardens
Phipps Garden Apartments
Phipps Mansion
Phipps Plaza
Rockburn Stud Farm
Spring Hill

References

Sources
 (daughter of John Shaffer Phipps)

"Love of horses helped to build a dynasty", The Sydney Morning Herald (April 30, 2002)

 
Business families of the United States